The Expediting Act (1903-02-11) was introduced in the United States of America by President Theodore Roosevelt to break up trusts by the steel, meatpacking, oil, and railroad industries by expediting their cases to the top of the list so they could be dealt with more quickly. This act was passed in 1903.

It also added staff to the Antitrust Division of the Justice Department.

United States federal antitrust legislation
1903 in American law